Bird Island (or Bird Islet) is an island in the City and Borough of Juneau, Alaska, United States. It was named by Captain Lester A. Beardslee of the United States Navy in 1880. The name was first published by the U.S. Coast and Geodetic Survey in 1883.

See also
Dobson Landing, Alaska

References

Islands of the Alexander Archipelago
Islands of Juneau, Alaska
Islands of Alaska